Kneža is a village in the Bača Valley in the Municipality of Tolmin in the Littoral region of Slovenia. The Bohinj Railway line runs through the settlement.

Name
Kneža was attested in written sources in 1377 as villa de Chinessa, and the corresponding hydronym (today Knežica Creek) was attested as Knesaha in 891. The name is derived from *Kъnędz′a (vьsь/voda/rěka) 'prince's (village/creek/river)', indicating that the territory was owned by a prince.

Church

The parish church in the settlement is dedicated to Saint George and belongs to the Koper Diocese.

References

External links 

Kneža on Geopedia

Populated places in the Municipality of Tolmin